Butch is the second and final studio album by American alternative country band The Geraldine Fibbers. It was released on July 1, 1997.

The album was recorded in December 1996 by John Goodmanson at The Sound Factory studios, in Los Angeles, California. The recording was mixed March–April 1997 at Brooklyn Recording, Los Angeles by Sally Browder assisted by Ronnie Rivera.

"California Tuffy" was released as a promotional music video and single. In the music video, Carla Bozulich uses a black cat puppet to lip synch the song while she and the band destroy furniture and set things on fire.

Spin magazine named Butch to their best albums of 1997 list.

Track listing

Personnel
The Geraldine Fibbers
 Carla Bozulich – vocals, electric guitar, acoustic guitar, piano, music box, glockenspiel, loops
 Nels Cline – guitar electric, 12 string guitar, slide guitar, bass guitar, calliope, organ
 Kevin Fitzgerald – drums, percussion, glockenspiel, vocals
 Jessy Greene – viola, violin, vocals
 William Tutton – acoustic bass, electric bass, cello, piano

Additional musicians
 Steve Fisk – celeste, optigan

References

External links
 [ Allmusic: Butch - The Geraldine Fibbers]

Butch
Geraldine Fibbers albums
Virgin Records albums
Albums produced by Steve Fisk